General elections were held in Basutoland in 1960 after a new Constitution was approved by the British authorities in September 1959. The public elected nine District Councils with a total of 162 members on 20 January. The District Councils subsequently elected 40 members of the National Council, with a further 14 members nominated by Moshoeshoe II, 22 members drawn from principal and ward chiefs and four members from among senior government officials.

Voter turnout was very low, with just 35,000 of the 191,000 registered voters taking part in the election. The new National Council was opened on 12 March.

Results

District Councils

National Council

References

Basutoland
Elections in Lesotho
General election
1960 election
Election and referendum articles with incomplete results